Nancy Catherine Greene Raine  (born May 11, 1943) is a Canadian former Senator for British Columbia and an Olympic alpine skier voted as Canada's Female Athlete of the 20th Century. She was born in Ottawa, Ontario, Canada. Greene Raine won the giant slalom in the 1968 Winter Olympics in Grenoble, France.

After being appointed to the Senate in 2009, Greene Raine retired on May 11, 2018, when she reached the mandatory retirement age of 75.

She is the mother of retired alpine skier Willy Raine.

Biography
Greene was born on May 11, 1943, in Ottawa, Ontario. She moved with her family to Rossland, British Columbia, before she was three years of age. Rossland is a mountainous area and the site of the first ski competition ever held in Canada in 1897. Greene began schussing at a young age and while in high school she competed in the Canadian Junior Championships. She would go on to win 14 World Cup victories by 1968.

Career

Nicknamed "Tiger" because of her "go for it" attitude and her aggressive style of skiing, she won the Canadian ski championship nine times and the United States championship three times. In 1967, Greene broke the European domination of the  sport, winning the inaugural World Cup. That year she won seven of 16 events, taking the over-all title with four giant slalom victories plus two in slalom and one in downhill. Her accomplishment earned her Canadian "Athlete of the Year" honours.

In 1968 she won the World Cup title again plus, at that year's Winter Olympic Games in Grenoble, France, she captured a gold medal in the giant slalom, by one of the largest margins in Olympic history, and a silver medal in the slalom. For the second time, she was named Canada's "Athlete of the Year".

Following her retirement from competition, she made a major contribution to Canadian sport by accepting an appointment to the federal government's "Task Force on Sport For Canadians". During this period Greene also did promotional work for various companies including Rossignol, Pontiac, and Mars Inc. In a 1970s television commercial for the latter product, she was seen to discard the wrapper onto a ski slope in the course of consuming the product. This minor act, coming at a time of nascent environmental sentiment, appears to have entered the public memory as references to it have dogged her over the years.

Married with twin boys, Greene and her husband Al Raine were instrumental in the early development of the Whistler-Blackcomb Resort in Whistler, British Columbia, and then later in the development and promotion of skiing at Sun Peaks Resort, just north of Kamloops. The expansion of the resort was not without controversy as some Native groups opposed the move, and protesters occupying the new site were removed by arrest under a provincial injunction.

Greene is the director of skiing at Sun Peaks Resort and skis almost every day. She and her husband built Nancy Greene's Cahilty Lodge, where they make their home. Dedicated to the promotion of her sport for more than 30 years, the Nancy Greene Ski League has been an important entry-level race program for young children.

Over the years, Greene has been the recipient of numerous awards including her country's highest civilian honour, the Order of Canada. She has been honoured with the naming of "Nancy Greene Provincial Park" and "Nancy Greene Lake" in the Monashee Mountains of British Columbia's Kootenay region. A stretch of Capilano Road in North Vancouver was renamed Nancy Greene Way. In 1999, her name was engraved in Canada's Walk of Fame and she was voted Canada's female athlete of the century in a survey of newspaper editors and broadcasters conducted by The Canadian Press and Broadcast News.

In 1990, Greene and husband Al Raine were encouraged by the BC provincial government to pursue the development of a new ski resort in the Melvin Creek Valley, between Mount Currie and Lillooet, both predominantly Native communities. Perhaps coincidentally, the rough road accessing the area was paved and upgraded at this time by the government as an extension to highway 99, the main road from Vancouver to Pemberton. Despite opposition from Native groups, backcountry recreationists, biologists, and environmental organizations, the project received approval from BC's Environmental Assessment Office in 2000, but has been stalled in a series of protests and blockades since.

In 1993, Greene announced her support for the right-wing Reform Party of Canada.

In April 2005, Greene was named chancellor of Thompson Rivers University.

In 2006, Greene-Raine contributed a small part of one of her Olympic competition skis to the Six String Nation project. Part of that material now serves as the second reinforcing strip on the interior of  Voyageur, the guitar at the heart of the project.

On January 2, 2009, Greene took her seat as a Conservative member of the Senate of Canada. After her 75th birthday, Greene retired as a senator.

She was named Olympic Ambassador for the 2010 Vancouver games. On February 12, 2010, Greene lit the Vancouver Olympic cauldron along with fellow Canadian sports icons Steve Nash, Rick Hansen, Catriona Le May Doan, and Wayne Gretzky.

Major awards

 National ski team member, 1959 to 1968
 Six-time Canadian champion
 Three-time United States champion
 World championship team member, 1962, 1966
 World Cup women's champion 1967, 1968
 Olympic team member, 1960, 1964, 1968
 1968 Winter Olympics gold medal (Giant slalom) and silver medal (slalom)
 Coach of the Canadian National Ski Team, 1968 to 1973
 Officer of the Order of Canada  (Canada’s highest civilian honour)
 Order of British Columbia (British Columbia's highest citizen award)
 Order of the Dogwood (British Columbia's highest civilian award)
 Lou Marsh Trophy as Canada's Outstanding Athlete of the Year, 1967, 1968
 B'nai B'rith woman of 1968
 British Columbia Sports Hall of Fame
 Canadian Sports Hall of Fame
 United States National Ski Hall of Fame
 Canada's Walk of Fame
 Canada's Female Athlete of the 20th Century
 Olympic torch relay 2010, Kamloops BC
 Queen Elizabeth II Diamond Jubilee Medal

Olympic results

World championship results 

From 1948 through 1980, the Winter Olympics were also the World Championships for alpine skiing.
At the World Championships from 1954 through 1980, the combined was a "paper race" using the results of the three events (DH, GS, SL).
Normally held in February, the championships were in August in 1966.

See also
 List of Canadian university leaders

References

External links

 
 
 
 Ski Queen Nancy Greene at CBC Digital Archives
 Senator Nancy Greene Raine at the Parliament of Canada

1943 births
Living people
Canadian female alpine skiers
Olympic alpine skiers of Canada
Olympic gold medalists for Canada
Olympic medalists in alpine skiing
Medalists at the 1968 Winter Olympics
Alpine skiers at the 1960 Winter Olympics
Alpine skiers at the 1964 Winter Olympics
Alpine skiers at the 1968 Winter Olympics
Lou Marsh Trophy winners
Members of the Order of British Columbia
Officers of the Order of Canada
Politicians from Ottawa
Canadian university and college chancellors
Sportspeople from British Columbia
People from Rossland, British Columbia
Skiers from Ottawa
Canadian senators from British Columbia
Conservative Party of Canada senators
Women members of the Senate of Canada
Women in British Columbia politics
FIS Alpine Ski World Cup champions
Canadian women academics
Women academic administrators
Olympic cauldron lighters
Olympic silver medalists for Canada
21st-century Canadian politicians
21st-century Canadian women politicians
Canadian academic administrators